Samlesbury is a civil parish in the South Ribble district of Lancashire, England.  It contains 22 listed buildings that are recorded in the National Heritage List for England.  Of these, two are listed at Grade I, the highest of the three grades, and the others are at Grade II, the lowest grade.  The parish is mainly rural, and many of its listed buildings are houses, farmhouses and farm buildings.  The most important buildings are Samlesbury Hall and the parish church, both of which are listed at Grade I.  The other listed buildings include structures associated with the church, a school, a bridge, a church built in the 19th century, and a lodge to the hall.


Key

Buildings

References

Citations

Sources

Lists of listed buildings in Lancashire
Buildings and structures in South Ribble